Dešeča Vas is a village on the right bank of the Krka River northwest of Žužemberk in southeastern Slovenia. The area is part of the historical region of Lower Carniola. The entire Municipality of Žužemberk is now included in the Southeast Slovenia Statistical Region.

References

External links

Dešeča Vas at Geopedia

Populated places in the Municipality of Žužemberk